is the Japanese industrial standard development organization. JSA promotes standardization and management system in Japan through the following activities:
 Development of national standards (JIS)
 Support of international standardization activities related to ISO, IEC
 Dissemination of standards
 Support of developing human resources in standardization and management system
 Conduct of Quality Management and Quality Control Certificate Examination
 Promotion of conformity assessment

History 
1945 December 6 : The Dai Nihon Aerial Technology Association and the Japan Management Association merged to form the Japanese Standards Association (JSA). JSA was authorized to incorporate by the Minister of Trade and Industry (now known as the Minister of Economy, Trade and Industry). Its office was first established at the Patent and Standards Bureau in Chiyoda-ku, Tokyo. 
1946 : The first issue of "Industrial Standards and Standardization" was published.
1949 : The first Quality Control (QC) seminar in Japan was held in June.
1950 : Publication of JIS commenced.
1951 : Drafting of JIS began.
1952 : The Head Office moved to Ginza Kobiki-cho, Chūō-ku, Tokyo.
1958 : The first National Meeting of Standardization was held.
1963 : The construction of JSA building was completed in Akasaka, Minato-ku, Tokyo.
1970 : The monthly magazine “Standardization Journal” was launched.
1994 : JSA Quality management system center was accredited by The Japan Accreditation Board for Conformity Assessment (JAB) as a registration body.
2002 : JSA Web Store opened.
2005 : The first Quality Management and Quality Control Certificate Examination was conducted.
2012 : The form of organization shifted from public interest incorporated foundation to the general incorporated foundation.
2013 : The Head Office moved to Mita, Minato-ku, Tokyo.

Standards 
JSA develops draft  JIS, and publishes and distributes  JIS. Usually, about 600  JIS are developed annually. Most of which are co-developed by JSA and other Industrial Associations based on a contract. Moreover, JSA itself conducts research activities and develops  JIS that is related to consumer protection, units and graphical symbols which are basic and common in many different fields and management system etc.
JSA supports other Industrial Associations to propose  JIS to ISO, and IEC as draft International Standard (IS).

See also
 Japanese Industrial Standards
 Japanese Industrial Standards Committee
 International Organization for Standardization
 International Electrotechnical Commission

Notes and references

External links
 Official homepage of JSA (Japanese/English)

Electrical safety standards organizations
Organizations established in 1945
Standards organizations in Japan

es:Japanese Standards Association
ru:JSA